South Africa competed at the 2000 Summer Olympics in Sydney, Australia.

The South African Airways had one of their Boeing 747-300s specially painted in rainbow colours to transport the South African Olympic team to Sydney. The aircraft was fondly dubbed the Ndizani.

Medalists

Archery

South Africa returned two of the archers that had competed four years earlier. Again, Lewis had the nation's only victory.

Women

Athletics

Men
Track & road events

Field events

Women
Track & road events

Field events

Baseball

South Africa's first appearance in the Olympic baseball tournament resulted in a last-place finish. The baseball team finished the preliminary round with a 1–6 record, having lost by 10 runs or more four times. The only team that South Africa defeated was the Netherlands.

Men

Preliminary round 

Team Roster

Neil Adonis
Clint Alfino
Francisco Alfino
Paul Bell 
Vaughn Berriman
Jason Cook

Errol Davis
Simon de la Rey
Nick Dempsey 
Ashley Dove 
Darryl Gonsalves 
Brian Harrell 

Tim Harrell 
Richard Harrell 
Ian Holness 
Kevin Johnson 
Willem Kemp
More MacKay 

Liall Mauritz 
Glen Morris 
Alan Phillips 
Darryn Smith
Russell van Niekerk

Boxing

Men

Canoeing

Sprint 
Men

Women

Cycling

Road Cycling

Track

Mountain biking

Football

Men's Team Competition
Team Roster

Emile Baron
Fabian McCarthy
David Kannemeyer
Nkhiphitheni Matombo
Matthew Booth
Quinton Fortune
Stanton Fredericks
Daniel Matsau
Toni Nhleko
Steve Lekoelea
Jabu Pule
Dumisa Ngobe
Abram Nteo
Aaron Mokoena
Siyabonga Nomvethe
Delron Buckley
Benni McCarthy
Brian Baloyi
Lebohang Kukane
Mzunani Mgwigwi
Patrick Mbuthu
Rowen Fernandez

Group D

Hockey

Women's Competition

Pool D 

 Advanced to medal round

Seventh to tenth place classification

Crossover

Ninth and tenth place 

Team Roster

'
Marilyn Agliotti
Kerry Bee
Caryn Bentley
Lindsey Carlisle

Pietie Coetzee
Alison Dare
Jacqueline Geyser
Anli Kotze

Michele MacNaughton
Luntu Ntloko
Karen Roberts
Karen Symons

Inke van Wyk
Carina van Zyl
Paola Vidulich
Susan Wessels

Judo

Women

Modern pentathlon

One female pentathlete represented South Africa in 2000.

Women

Rowing

Qualification Legend: FA=Final A (medal); FB=Final B (non-medal); FC=Final C (non-medal); FD=Final D (non-medal); FE=Final E (non-medal); FF=Final F (non-medal); SA/B=Semifinals A/B; SC/D=Semifinals C/D; SE/F=Semifinals E/F; R=Repechage

Sailing

Men

Open

Shooting

Men

Swimming

Men

Women

Taekwondo

South Africa has qualified a single taekwondo jin.

Tennis

Men

Women

Triathlon

Wrestling

Freestyle

References

sports-reference
Wallechinsky, David (2004). The Complete Book of the Summer Olympics (Athens 2004 Edition). Toronto, Canada. . 
International Olympic Committee (2001). The Results. Retrieved 12 November 2005.
Sydney Organising Committee for the Olympic Games (2001). Official Report of the XXVII Olympiad Volume 1: Preparing for the Games. Retrieved 20 November 2005.
Sydney Organising Committee for the Olympic Games (2001). Official Report of the XXVII Olympiad Volume 2: Celebrating the Games. Retrieved 20 November 2005.
Sydney Organising Committee for the Olympic Games (2001). The Results. Retrieved 20 November 2005.
International Olympic Committee Web Site

Nations at the 2000 Summer Olympics
2000
Summer Olympics